Ernest Joseph Beck (born December 11, 1931) is a retired American professional basketball player.  Born in Philadelphia, Beck played seven years in the National Basketball Association for the Philadelphia Warriors, St. Louis Hawks and Syracuse Nationals.  He was a territorial pick in the 1953 NBA Draft, selected by the Warriors.  He attended University of Pennsylvania.

NBA career statistics

Regular season

|-
| align="left" | 1953–54
| align="left" | Philadelphia
| 15 || - || 28.1 || .275 || - || .791 || 3.3 || 2.3 || - || - || 7.5
|-
| style="text-align:left;background:#afe6ba;" | 1955–56†
| align="left" | Philadelphia
| 67 || - || 15.0 || .387 || - || .717 || 2.9 || 1.2 || - || - || 5.2
|-
| align="left" | 1956–57
| align="left" | Philadelphia
| style="background:#cfecec;" | 72* || - || 24.2 || .384 || - || .707 || 4.3 || 2.6 || - || - || 7.0
|-
| align="left" | 1957–58
| align="left" | Philadelphia
| 71 || - || 27.8 || .398 || - || .837 || 4.3 || 2.7 || - || - || 10.1
|-
| align="left" | 1958–59
| align="left" | Philadelphia
| 70 || - || 14.5 || .390 || - || .662 || 2.5 || 1.3 || - || - || 5.3
|-
| align="left" | 1959–60
| align="left" | Philadelphia
| 66 || - || 12.3 || .388 || - || .844 || 1.9 || 1.1 || - || - || 3.9
|-
| align="left" | 1960–61
| align="left" | St. Louis
| 7 || - || 8.9 || .333 || - || 1.000 || 1.7 || 1.9 || - || - || 2.7
|-
| align="left" | 1960–61
| align="left" | Syracuse
| 3 || - || 6.7 || .375 || - || .500 || 3.7 || 0.7 || - || - || 2.3
|- class="sortbottom"
| style="text-align:center;" colspan="2"| Career
| 371 || - || 19.0 || .383 || - || .762 || 3.2 || 1.8 || - || - || 6.3
|}

Playoffs

|-
| style="text-align:left;background:#afe6ba;" | 1955–56†
| align="left" | Philadelphia
| style="background:#cfecec;" | 10* || - || 25.0 || .431 || - || .710 || 5.1 || 2.2 || - || - || 8.4
|-
| align="left" | 1956–57
| align="left" | Philadelphia
| 2 || - || 44.5 || .368 || - || 1.000 || 5.0 || 2.5 || - || - || 15.5
|-
| align="left" | 1957–58
| align="left" | Philadelphia
| 8 || - || 19.5 || .377 || - || .667 || 4.0 || 1.6 || - || - || 6.5
|-
| align="left" | 1959–60
| align="left" | Philadelphia
| 4 || - || 5.5 || .444 || - || .000 || 1.5 || 0.8 || - || - || 2.0
|- class="sortbottom"
| style="text-align:center;" colspan="2"| Career
| 24 || - || 21.5 || .400 || - || .705 || 4.1 || 1.8 || - || - || 7.3
|}

See also
List of NCAA Division I men's basketball season rebounding leaders
List of NCAA Division I men's basketball career rebounding leaders

External links
Career statistics

1931 births
Living people
All-American college men's basketball players
American men's basketball players
Basketball players from Philadelphia
Penn Quakers men's basketball players
Philadelphia Warriors draft picks
Philadelphia Warriors players
Shooting guards
Small forwards
St. Louis Hawks players
Syracuse Nationals players